Matthew T. Hudgins (born March 1, 1982), known by his stage name XL Middleton, is an American modern G-funk record producer and DJ. He is also a co-founder and co-owner of the record label MoFunk, which releases boogie and funk recordings.

Discography

Studio albums 

 Tap Water (2015)
 XL Middleton + Eddy Funkster (2016)
 Things Are Happening (2017)
 2 Minutes Till Midnight (2019)
XL Middleton & Delmar Xavier VII (2021)

Singles 
 "Music 4 A Drunken Evening" (2004) with Dazzie Dee
 "One Hit Away" (2009) with Crooked I and BQ
 "Back To L.A." (2014)

References

G-funk artists
American funk musicians
1982 births
Living people